Nicolae Veştea (born 11 July 1950) is a Romanian biathlete. He competed in the 20 km individual event at the 1972 Winter Olympics.

References

1950 births
Living people
Romanian male biathletes
Olympic biathletes of Romania
Biathletes at the 1972 Winter Olympics
People from Râșnov